.zw is the Internet country code top-level domain (ccTLD) for Zimbabwe.

Although no registry Web site is shown in the IANA whois listing, at least .co.zw registrations are presently being taken by the Zimbabwe Internet Service Providers Association, whose charter claims that one of the purposes of the organization's founding was to oversee the .zw domain.

.ac.zw registrations are being taken by the University of Zimbabwe. Applications are handled by this institution's Computer Centre. As with the general norm, .ac.zw registrations are for academic institutions.

.org.zw registrations are taken by the country's fixed telecommunications provider, TelOne. These are intended for use by NGOs, and similar organisations but any restrictions are not clear.

TelOne is also listed as the administrative and technical contact of the domain.

References

External links
 IANA .zw whois information

Country code top-level domains
Communications in Zimbabwe
Computer-related introductions in 1991
Internet in Zimbabwe

sv:Toppdomän#Z